The following is a list of Bradley Braves men's basketball head coaches. The Braves have had 14 coaches in their 119-season history.

Bradley's current head coach is Brian Wardle. He was hired in March 2015 to replace Geno Ford, who was fired after the 2014–15 season.

References

Bradley

Bradley Braves men's basketball coaches